Silverware may refer to:
 Household silver including
Tableware
Cutlery
Candlesticks
The work of a silversmith
 Silverware is also a slang term for a collection of trophies

See also 
 Tea set#Silver tea service